The 2012 Torneo Internacional AGT was a professional tennis tournament played on hard courts. It was the tenth edition of the tournament which was part of the 2012 ATP Challenger Tour. It took place in León, Mexico between 9 and 15 April 2012.

ATP entrants

Seeds

 1 Rankings are as of April 2, 2012.

Other entrants
The following players received wildcards into the singles main draw:
  Miguel Gallardo Valles
  Marinko Matosevic
  César Ramírez
  Manuel Sanchez

The following players received entry as an alternate into the singles main draw:
  John-Patrick Smith

The following players received entry from the qualifying draw:
  Colin Ebelthite
  John Peers
  Bruno Rodriguez
  Denis Zivkovic

The following players received entry as a lucky loser:
  Christopher Díaz Figueroa

Champions

Singles

 Denis Zivkovic def.  Rajeev Ram, 7–6(7–5), 6–4

Doubles

 John Peers /  John-Patrick Smith def.  César Ramírez /  Bruno Rodríguez, 6–3, 6–3

External links
ITF Search
ATP official site

Torneo Internacional AGT
Torneo Internacional Challenger León
2012 in Mexican tennis